Richard Stephen Graham (born 5 August 1979) is a retired Northern Ireland footballer who is assistant manager for Wingate & Finchley. He played as a left-midfielder.

Career
Born in Newry, County Down, Graham began his career in the Queens Park Rangers youth system, making two first team appearances in the Football League, but he was released in 2001. He moved into non-League football, joining Barnet in 2004 and helped them return to the Football League. He was released by the club in April 2007, subsequently joining Dagenham & Redbridge in June.

On 1 January 2009, Graham joined former club Kettering Town on loan for the remainder of the 2008–09 Conference National season. He made his debut two days later in a 2–1 victory over Eastwood Town in the FA Cup, with his performance being described as the "most impressive". He signed for Grays Athletic on 24 July, along with Charlie Taylor and Shayne Mangodza. He was released at the end of the 2009–10 season. In June 2011, Graham signed for Dartford. On 20 July 2012, Graham joined St Albans City. On 27 March 2014, Graham joined Chesham United a week after being released by St Albans City after 75 appearances and five goals.

References

External links
 
 
 

1979 births
Living people
Association footballers from Northern Ireland
Association football midfielders
Queens Park Rangers F.C. players
Chesham United F.C. players
Billericay Town F.C. players
Kettering Town F.C. players
Barnet F.C. players
Dagenham & Redbridge F.C. players
Grays Athletic F.C. players
Eastleigh F.C. players
Dartford F.C. players
St Albans City F.C. players
Wingate & Finchley F.C. players
VCD Athletic F.C. players
English Football League players
National League (English football) players
Isthmian League players